Events in the year 1992 in  Turkey.

Parliament
19th Parliament of Turkey

Incumbents
President – Turgut Özal
Prime Minister – Süleyman Demirel 
Leader of the opposition – Mesut Yılmaz

Ruling party and the main opposition
 Ruling party – True Path Party (DYP)
 Main opposition – Motherland Party (ANAP)

Cabinet
49th government of Turkey

Events
2 January – Avalanche in Hakkari Province, 19 deaths
1 February – Avalanche in Şırnak Province, 91 deaths 
3 March – Mine accident in Zonguldak Province, 122 deaths 
13 March – The 6.7  Erzincan earthquake shook area with a maximum Mercalli intensity of VIII (Severe), killing 498–652 and injuring 2,000. 
16 May – Clash between the armed forces and the terrorists in Şırnak Province
17 May – Beşiktaş won the championship of the Turkish football league
15 June – In European Double trap championship, Turkish team won the gold medal
19 June – All parties closed by the previous military government were given the right to be reestablished
24 June – Organization of the Black Sea Economic Cooperation treaty was signed in İstanbul
28 July – Weightlifter Naim Süleymanoğlu won gold medal in World championship in Barselona
30 August – Clash between the armed forces and the terrorists from Iran  
9 September – Republican People's Party (CHP) was refounded on the 59th anniversary of the CHP's former establishment (Most members are from the Social Democrat Populist Party (SHP)  
29 September – Clash between the armed forces and the terrorists in Hakkari Province 
16 October and the following days – In a hot pursuit operation armed forces entered Iraq
23 November – In World Karate championship held in Granada, Veysel Bumin won the gold medal
13 January – President vetoed the ILO convention
2 December – Split in ANAP  
31 December – The film Basic Instinct was banned

Births
1 January – Esma Aydemir, middle-distance runner
3 February – Berkin Kamil Arslan, footballer
7 February – Engin Bekdemir, footballer
14 August – Barış Yardımcı, footballer
23 February – Şaziye Okur, weightlifter
2 March – Kerem Bulut, footballer
27 March – Kıvılcım Kaya, hammer thrower
10 April – Atila Turan, footballer
10 May – Barış Örücü, footballer
3 August – Gamze Bulut, distance runner
16 August – Nur Tatar, taekwondo practitioner 
7 September – Gizem Karaca, model
24 October – Emel Türkyılmaz, basketball player
26 October – Ayşegül Günay, basketball player

Deaths
7 February – Mevhibe İnönü (born 1897), İsmet İnönü's wife
13 April – Feza Gürsey (born 1921), physicist
22 July – Toto Karaca (born 1912), theatre actor
29 July – Kemal Kayacan (born 1915), admiral
9 August – Aytekin Kotil (born 1934), politician
5 October – Adile Ayda (born 1912), diplomat

Gallery

Sports
Turkey at the 1992 Summer Olympics 
Turkey at the 1992 Winter Olympics

See also
Turkey in the Eurovision Song Contest 1992 
1991-92 1.Lig

References

 
Years of the 20th century in Turkey
Turkey
Turkey
Turkey